Ross Strudwick (born 1950) is an Australian former rugby league footballer and coach. An Australian international, New South Wales and Queensland representative halfback of the 1970s, he played club football in the New South Wales Rugby Football League Premiership for St. George and in the Brisbane Rugby League Premiership for Fortitude Valley. Strudwick later embarked on a coaching career in Queensland and England.

Playing
Strudwick started his career in the New South Wales Rugby Football League premiership with St. George Dragons in 1969. He played there until 1972, gaining selection for New South Wales during this period. Strudwick was the understudy to the champion Dragons halfback Billy Smith during that period, thus his first grade appearances were irregular.

After moving north to play in the Brisbane Rugby League premiership with Fortitude Valley, Strudwick was selected to represent Queensland several times and also played for Australia in the 1975 World Series. He was captain of Valleys when a teenage Wally Lewis made his first grade debut for the club in 1978 and worked with the youngster to help develop his long passing skills. That year they made the Grand Final but lost to Easts. The following year, with Strudwick as captain-coach, Valleys beat Souths to win the 1979 BRL premiership.

Coaching
Following his retirement from playing, Strudwick continued coaching in Queensland, taking Brothers to victory in the 1987 BRL grand final, before moving to England the following year to take up opportunities there. He coached Halifax during the 1980s but was sacked after a home defeat by Featherstone Rovers. He also worked as a television match commentator for BBC Grandstand, and coached and managed London Crusaders before being replaced by Darryl van der Velde in 1992. He resigned as general manager of the club in 1993.

Strudwick is also the founder and CEO of a sporting goods retail franchise called Struddys, and his son, Nathan has also played rugby league, signing with the Brisbane Broncos club.

References
 Whiticker, Alan & Hudson, Glen (2006) The Encyclopedia of Rugby League Players, Gavin Allen Publishing, Sydney

Footnotes

1950 births
Living people
Australia national rugby league team players
Australian rugby league coaches
Australian rugby league players
Brisbane rugby league team players
Date of birth missing (living people)
Fortitude Valley Diehards players
Halifax R.L.F.C. coaches
London Broncos coaches
Past Brothers players
Queensland rugby league team players
Rugby league halfbacks
Rugby league players from Nyngan, New South Wales
St. George Dragons players